"Big" John Wallace is a bassist and singer who became known as a backup for singer-songwriter Harry Chapin.

Career

Musician
Wallace gained membership of Chapin's band by responding to an ad placed in the Village Voice in 1971. Other responders to the ad included cellist Tim Scott and guitarist Ron Palmer.

When Harry Chapin and his brothers went on tour in 1971, Harry asked Wallace to continue with his backing band as bass guitarist and backup vocalist.  John Wallace performed with Chapin for ten years, until Harry Chapin's death in 1981. In live concerts, Wallace would sing very high head tones on songs such as "Taxi".  However, John displayed a remarkable vocal range, as he also sang the baritone parts in "Mr. Tanner" and "30,000 Pounds of Bananas".

Wallace performed the singing voice of Bluto on the soundtrack and album of Robert Altman's 1980 feature film Popeye, starring Robin Williams. Actor Paul L. Smith acted and spoke as Bluto.

Wallace formed another band, The Strangers, that included himself, Doug Walker, and Howie Fields (from the Harry Chapin band) along with newcomer Malcolm Ruhl.  The band played more conventional rock music, as opposed to 'Harry Chapin-type' music, but was short-lived. They performed at Clarence Clemons' Big Man's West on December 18, 1981.

In 1991, the band he spent ten years with was reunited with Steve Chapin at the helm. Steve, Harry's drummer Howard Fields, and John continue to perform as the Steve Chapin Band. They also perform occasionally in a larger ensemble including Tom Chapin and other Chapin family members.

References

External links
Steve Chapin Band official website 
Chapin Family official web site

Year of birth missing (living people)
Living people
American rock bass guitarists
American male singers
American male bass guitarists